Ballyhay is a townland near Donaghadee in County Down, Northern Ireland. It is in the civil parish of Donaghadee and the historic barony of Ards Lower. It is called Bellyhie in Ulster-Scots.

Ballyhay is a rural farming community with much land used for arable and pasture farming. There are records of a church flourishing in the area since the late 13th to early 14th centuries.

Transport is available via the Number 7 bus (Moss road/Windmill road, Killaughey road) which travels from Millisle to Belfast via the Moss road.

References

 History From Headstones

Townlands of County Down
Civil parish of Donaghadee